Świerże Górne is a village in the administrative district of Gmina Kozienice, within Kozienice County, Masovian Voivodeship, in east-central Poland.

Kozienice Power Station is located here.

The village has a population of 1,800.

References

Villages in Kozienice County